Ella Margareta Kivikoski (25 May 1901 in Tammela – 27 July 1990) was the first Finnish female to earn a doctorate in archaeology in Finland. In 1931, she studied at the Baltic Institute in Stockholm and developed a scholarly working relationship with the Estonian archaeologist Harri Moora. She was a Professor of Archaeology at the University of Helsinki from 1948 until 1969, specializing in both Finnish and Nordic archaeology. Her specialty was the Finnish Iron Age.

Selected works
Die Eisenzeit in Auraflussgebiet. (Thesis/dissertation, 1939.) (Translations in Finnish, English and German.)
Suomen historiallinen bibliografia 1901-1925: Finsk historisk bibliografi: Bibliographie historique finlandaise: I-II. (1 vol.) (with Aarno Maliniemi) Helsinki: Suomen historiallinen seura, (1940) (in Finnish)
Strena archaeologica (with Aaarne Michael) Helsinki: Puromies, (1945) (in Finnish)
Suomen rautakauden kuvasto, Vol 1 Porvoo: W. Söderström, (1947) (in Finnish)
Suomen rautakauden kuvasto, Vol 2 Porvoo: W. Söderström, (1951) (in Finnish)
Carolla Archaeologica in Honorem C.A. Nordmann (with C A Nordmann) Helsinki: Puromiehen Kirjapaino, (1952) (in Finnish)
Suomen historia 1: Suomen esihistoria (with Jalmari Jaakkola) Helsinki: W. Söderström, (1958) (in Finnish)
Suomen historia. Osa 1, Suomen esihistoria (with Jalmari Jaakkola) Porvoo: WSOY, (1961) (in Finnish)
Suomen arkeologinen bibliografia 1951-1960 = Die archäologische Bibliographie Finnlands 1951-1960 Helsinki: [s.n.], (1962) (in Finnish)
Finlands förhistoria (Suomen esihistoria, schwed.) Helsinki: O. Weilin & Göös, (1964) (Translations in Finnish, English, German and Swedish)
Suomen kiinteät muinaisjäänökset Helsinki: Suomalaisen Kirjallisuuden Seura, (1966) Finnish

References

External links
 WorldCat
 Ella Kivikoski in 375 humanists. 10 May 2015. Faculty of Arts, University of Helsinki.

1901 births
1990 deaths
Finnish archaeologists
20th-century Finnish women writers
20th-century Finnish writers
Finnish women academics
Finnish women archaeologists
20th-century archaeologists